Kaki Bukit SC is a football club based in Kaki Bukit, Singapore. The club is currently competing in the Singapore National Football League, in which they won the 3rd division of the 2006 edition.

References

 https://eresources.nlb.gov.sg/newspapers/Digitised/Article/beritaharian19870108-1.2.45.3?ST=1&AT=search&k=kaki%20bukit%20sc&QT=kaki,bukit,sc&oref=article
 https://eresources.nlb.gov.sg/newspapers/Digitised/Article/beritaharian19880410-1.2.37.5?ST=1&AT=search&k=kaki%20bukit%20sc&QT=kaki,bukit,sc&oref=article
 https://eresources.nlb.gov.sg/newspapers/Digitised/Article/beritaharian19821208-1.2.38.6?ST=1&AT=search&k=kaki%20bukit%20sc&QT=kaki,bukit,sc&oref=article
 https://eresources.nlb.gov.sg/newspapers/Digitised/Article/newnation19810730-1.2.71.1?ST=1&AT=search&k=kaki%20bukit%20sc&QT=kaki,bukit,sc&oref=article
 https://eresources.nlb.gov.sg/newspapers/Digitised/Article/beritaharian19840331-1.2.40.7?ST=1&AT=search&k=kaki+bukit+sc&P=10&Display=0&filterS=0&QT=kaki,bukit,sc&oref=article
http://www.fas.org.sg/minor_team/kaki-bukit-sc/
https://www.todayonline.com/sports/football/nfl-clubs-get-their-day-sun-because-upcoming-fas-elections
http://www.rsssf.com/tabless/sing06.html
http://www.fas.org.sg/about-fas/fas-members/
https://mycujoo.tv/en/team/kaki-bukit-sc-cjxpt9owr15ng0hw3hlxre7s5

Football clubs in Singapore